The General Dynamics X-62 VISTA ("Variable Stability In-flight Simulator Test Aircraft") is an experimental aircraft, derived from the F-16D Fighting Falcon, which was modified as a joint venture between General Dynamics and Calspan for use by the United States Air Force (USAF). Originally designated NF-16D, the aircraft was redesignated X-62A on 14 June 2021 as part of an upgrade to a Skyborg, with System for Autonomous Control of Simulation (SACS).

X-62A remains on the curriculum of the Air Force Test Pilot School as a practice aircraft for test pilots.

Design and development

The NF-16D VISTA testbed aircraft incorporated a multi-axis thrust vectoring (MATV) engine nozzle that provides for more active control of the aircraft in a post-stall situation. As a result, the aircraft is supermaneuverable, retaining pitch and yaw control at angles of attack beyond which the traditional control surfaces cannot change attitude.

The NF-16D VISTA is a Block 30 F-16D based on the airframe design of the Israeli Air Force version, which incorporates a dorsal fairing running the length of the fuselage aft of the canopy and a heavyweight landing gear derived from the Block 40 F-16C/D. The fairing houses most of the variable-stability equipment and test instrumentation. The heavyweight gear permits simulation of aircraft with higher landing sink rates than a standard F-16.

The program was notable for the development of Direct Voice Input and the "Virtual HUD", which were both eventually to be incorporated into the cockpit design for the F-35 Lightning II.

The VISTA aircraft is now operated by the U.S. Air Force Test Pilot School and maintained by Calspan at Edwards Air Force Base. It is regularly used in student curriculum sorties, special academic projects, and flight research.  As of 14 June 2021 VISTA is in the midst of upgrading. In addition to replacing the VISTA Simulation System (VSS) with a newer, upgraded version of the same system, a System for Autonomous Control of Simulation (SACS) will be added in order to operate X-62A as a Skyborg. One application is as autonomously piloted aircraft, perhaps as robotic wingman to a manned aircraft.

Specifications

See also

References

External links

 VISTA gets a new look

F-16 VISTA
NASA aircraft
1970s United States experimental aircraft
Single-engined jet aircraft
Relaxed-stability aircraft
Aircraft first flown in 1992
Three dimension thrust vectoring aircraft